Daniel Joseph Walker-Rice (born 10 November 2000) is a professional footballer who plays as a forward for Bala Town.

Career statistics

Club

Notes

References

2000 births
Living people
Footballers from Greater London
English footballers
Association football forwards
National League (English football) players
English Football League players
Cymru Premier players
Tranmere Rovers F.C. players
Bala Town F.C. players